Pickens is a surname. Notable people with the surname include:

Andrew Pickens (congressman) (1739–1817), American soldier and politician; US Representative from South Carolina
Andrew Pickens (governor) (1779–1838), American soldier, lawyer, planter, and politician; governor of South Carolina; son of Andrew Pickens (congressman)
Buster Pickens (1916–1964), American blues pianist
Carl Pickens (born 1970), American football player
Claude Pickens (1900–1985),American missionary and photographer in China
Ezekiel Pickens (1768–1813), American politician; lieutenant governor of South Carolina
Francis Wilkinson Pickens (1805–1869), American politician; governor of South Carolina
George Pickens (born 2001), American football player
Israel Pickens (1780-1827)  American politician; governor of Alabama
James Pickens, Jr. (born 1954), American actor
Slim Pickens (1919–1983), American actor and cowboy
T. Boone Pickens, Jr. (1928-2019), American businessman and philanthropist
J. P. Pickens (1937–1973), American musician, poet, and artist
William Pickens (1881–1954), African-American orator, educator, journalist, and essayist
Willie Pickens (1931–2017), American musician
Zacch Pickens (born 2000), American football player